Araluen Pumpback Dam is a minor dam on the Canning River. Water stored in the dam can be pumped back into Canning Dam where the water is treated and distributed through the metropolitan trunk main distribution system.

See also
List of reservoirs and dams in Australia

References

History of Western Australia
Dams in Western Australia